1995 saw many sequels and prequels in video games, such as Dragon Quest VI, Mario's Picross,  Mega Man 7, Super Mario World 2: Yoshi's Island, and Tekken 2, along with new titles such as Battle Arena Toshinden, Chrono Trigger, Rayman, Soul Edge, Twisted Metal, Star Wars: Dark Forces, Destruction Derby, Wipeout and Jumping Flash!

The year's highest-grossing arcade game in Japan was Virtua Fighter 2, while the best-selling arcade video games in the United States were Daytona USA (for the second year in a row) and Mortal Kombat 3. The home video game with the highest known sales in 1995 was Dragon Quest VI, despite only releasing in Japan. The Super Famicom was the best-selling game console in Japan, while the Sega Genesis was the best-selling console in North America.

Hardware releases
Nintendo releases:
March 20 – Game Boy Play It Loud! series, color/clear versions of the Game Boy.
April 23 – Satellaview accessory for the Super Famicom console in Japan only.
July 21 – Virtual Boy 32-bit console in Japan. It is discontinued on December 22.

May 11 – Sega releases the Sega Saturn console in North America.
August 14 – The Nintendo Entertainment System (NES) is discontinued in North America.
September 9 – Sony releases the PlayStation console in the United States.
September 29 – Sony releases the PlayStation console in Europe.
October 25 – Funtech releases the Super A'Can console in Taiwan.

Top-rated games

Major awards

Famitsu Platinum Hall of Fame
The following video game releases in 1995 entered Famitsu magazine's "Platinum Hall of Fame" for receiving Famitsu scores of at least 35 out of 40.

Financial performance

Highest-grossing arcade games

Japan
In Japan, the following titles were the highest-grossing arcade video games of 1995, according to the annual Gamest and Game Machine charts.

United States
In the United States, the following titles were the highest-grossing arcade video games of 1995, according to the American Amusement Machine Association (AAMA) and Amusement & Music Operators Association (AMOA).

Best-selling video game consoles

Best-selling home video games 
The following titles were the top ten best-selling home video games of 1995 in Japan and the United States.

Japan
In Japan, the following titles were the top ten best-selling home video games of 1995.

United States
In the United States, the following titles were the top ten best-selling home video games of 1995.

United Kingdom
In the United Kingdom, the following titles were the best-selling home video games of 1995.

Game releases

Events

 January or February – Stars! is released as shareware.
 April 6 – Funco Inc., parent company of video game retailer FuncoLand, announces that vice president and director Stanley Bodine is promoted to president and chief operating officer, replacing founder David R. Pomije, who will remain as chairman and chief executive. Financial controller Robert Hiben is also named chief financial officer, while vice president of merchandising and information systems Michael Hinnenkamp resigns from the company to pursue other career opportunities.
 May 11 – Introduction of trade magazine GameWeek (then called Video Game Advisor).
 May 11–13 – The 1st annual Electronic Entertainment Expo (E3) is held in Los Angeles, California.
 November 5 – GameFAQs debuts on the web, as an archive of video game FAQs.
 November 24 – Nintendo unveils a playable version of the Nintendo Ultra 64, later renamed the Nintendo 64, at the 7th Annual Nintendo Space World Software Exhibition in Japan. Thirteen games were demonstrated but only two were in playable form, Kirby Ball 64 and Super Mario 64.

Business
New companies: BioWare, Frog City, Interworld Productions (renamed Mythic Entertainment in 1997), Remedy, TalonSoft
Defunct: Cyberdreams
Nintendo v. Samsung Electronics; Nintendo sues Samsung for promoting software piracy. The suit is settled.
Nintendo of America, Inc. v. NTDEC

See also
1995 in games

References

External links

 
Video games by year